Carolines may refer to:
Caroline Islands, an archipelago in the western Pacific Ocean, part of Micronesia and Palau
Carolines on Broadway, a venue for stand-up comedy in New York, New York

See also
 Carolinas, a region of the United States